The Santer-Poos III Ministry was the government of Luxembourg between 13 July 1994 and 26 January 1995.  It was the third of three led by, and named after, Prime Minister Jacques Santer.  Throughout the ministry, the Deputy Prime Minister was Jacques Poos.

It was formed following the general election of 1994. It represented a coalition between Santer's Christian Social People's Party (CSV) and Poos' Luxembourg Socialist Workers' Party (LSAP), which had once more been elected the largest and second-largest parties in the legislature.

Ministers

Formation 
At the general election of 12 June 1994, the CSV and the LSAP remained the two strongest parties and received 21 and 17 seats respectively. The third-placed party, the Democratic Party, received only 12 Deputies in the new Chamber. The Greens (Déi Gréng GLEI/GAP) and the "action committee" ADR (Aktiounskomitee fir Demokratie a Rentegerechtegkeet) each received five representatives in the parliament. The CSV and LSAP decided to continue their coalition: the Santer-Poos partnership entered its third legislative period.

The government was later reshuffled after Jacques Santer was appointed president of the European Commission on 23 January 1995. The European Council of heads of state and of government, in Brussels on 15 July 1994, had designated the Luxembourgish Prime Minister to this post to succeed Jacques Delors.

Foreign policy 
The government's policy was marked by the implementation of the Maastricht Treaty and the enlargement and deepening of the European Union. It aimed to reaffirm Luxembourg's place in a united Europe that was respectful of differences. Luxembourg wanted to be a full partner, while preserving its identity and specificity.

Domestic policy 
Domestically, the government was faced with a considerable need for public investments, especially with regards to roads, schools infrastructure, the hospital sector and refuse collection and waste-water infrastructure. The key points of government action were, apart from improvement of infrastructure, educational reform, environmental protection, the modernisation of public administration as well as family policy and social security.

References 
 

Ministries of Luxembourg
History of Luxembourg (1945–present)
1994 establishments in Luxembourg
1995 disestablishments in Luxembourg
Cabinets established in 1994
Cabinets disestablished in 1995